The 2009 Paul Hunter Classic was a pro–am snooker tournament that took place between 13 and 16 August 2009. Shaun Murphy was the reigning champion, and defended his title in the final against Jimmy White with a 4–0 win.

Main draw

Century breaks

139  Shaun Murphy
133  Rod Lawler
132  Ryan Day
126, 107  Alan McManus
126  Marcus Campbell
125  Mark King
124  Stuart Bingham
122  Ken Doherty
121  Mark Selby
115, 102  Jimmy White
112  Joe Swail
107, 105  Jimmy Michie
107  Barry Pinches
107  Judd Trump
106  Fergal O'Brien
103  Michael Holt
101, 100  Dave Harold
100  Joe Perry

References

Paul Hunter Classic
2009 in snooker
2009 in German sport
August 2009 sports events in Europe